Bihibare is a village in the Kanepokhari Rural Municipality in the Morang District of Province No. 1, south-eastern Nepal.
It is the center of Kanepokhari Ward 6, which had a population of 5,771 in 2011.

Location

Bihibare is in Nepal, Province 1, Morang, Kanepokhari.
It is to the east of Bargachhi and northeast of Ramailo.
The village was previously in Bayarban Ward 8.

Name

The Nepali word Bihibar means "Thursday".
Bihibare is a common Eastern Nepal town name that indicates the day of the weekly haat bazaar.
GeoNames lists 6 populated places in Nepal with this name.

Population

In 2068 BS (2011 CE) Kanepokhari Ward 6 had 1,340 households with a total population of 5,771 of which 2,613 were male and 3,158 were female.
The ward was previously Bayarban Ward 8.

References

Kanepokhari Rural Municipality